Terekhovo is a rural locality (a settlement) in Nizhnekamenskoye Rural Settlement, Talovsky District, Voronezh Oblast, Russia. The population was 348 inf 2010. There are three streets.

Geography 
Porokhovo is the nearest rural locality.

References 

Rural localities in Talovsky District